Hasan Tayyeb (also Romanized as Ḩasan Ţayyeb; also known as Shahrak-e Ḩasan Ţayyeb) is a village in Seyyed Abbas Rural District, Shavur District, Shush County, Khuzestan Province, Iran. At the 2006 census, its population was 56, in 10 families.

References 

Populated places in Shush County